The Stokes Range is a mountain range on Bathurst Island, Nunavut, Canada. The range is one of the northernmost ranges in the world and of the Arctic Cordillera.

See also
List of mountain ranges

References

External links
Peakbagger.com: Stokes Range

Arctic Cordillera
Mountain ranges of Qikiqtaaluk Region
Mountains of Canada under 1000 metres